Charles F. Jones (October 24, 1861 – September 15, 1922) was an American professional baseball player. He played part of one season in Major League Baseball for the 1884 Brooklyn Atlantics.

During his one major league season, Jones played 11 games as a third baseman, 13 games as a  second baseman, and two games in the outfield for a total playing time of 25 games.  He batted .178, hit one double, and had five bases on balls.

Jones died at the age of 60 in hometown of New York City, and is interred at St. Raymond Cemetery in The Bronx, New York.

References

External links

Major League Baseball third basemen
Major League Baseball second basemen
Brooklyn Atlantics (AA) players
Newark Domestics players
Binghamton Crickets (1880s) players
Scranton Miners players
Bridgeport Giants players
Newark Trunkmakers players
Newark Little Giants players
Worcester Grays players
Lebanon (minor league baseball) players
Providence Clamdiggers (baseball) players
Troy Trojans (minor league) players
Albany Senators players
Burials at Saint Raymond's Cemetery (Bronx)
19th-century baseball players
Baseball players from New York City
1861 births
1922 deaths